In enzymology, a L-lysine 6-transaminase is an enzyme that catalyzes the chemical reaction

L-lysine + 2-oxoglutarate  2-aminoadipate 6-semialdehyde + L-glutamate

Thus, the two substrates of this enzyme are L-lysine and 2-oxoglutarate, whereas its two products are 2-aminoadipate 6-semialdehyde and L-glutamate.

This enzyme belongs to the family of transferases, specifically the transaminases, which transfer nitrogenous groups. This enzyme participates in lysine biosynthesis.  It employs one cofactor, pyridoxal phosphate.

Nomenclature 

The systematic name of this enzyme class is L-lysine:2-oxoglutarate 6-aminotransferase. Other names in common use include
 lysine 6-aminotransferase, 
 lysine epsilon-aminotransferase, 
 lysine epsilon-transaminase, 
 lysine:2-ketoglutarate 6-aminotransferase,
 L-lysine-alpha-ketoglutarate aminotransferase, and 
 L-lysine-alpha-ketoglutarate 6-aminotransferase.

Structure 

L-lysine 6-transaminase belongs to the aminotransferase class-III family. Crystal structures of L-lysine 6-transaminase reveal a Glu243 “switch” through which the enzyme changes substrate specificities.

References

Further reading 

 
 
 

EC 2.6.1
Pyridoxal phosphate enzymes
Enzymes of unknown structure